Atalia is an Italian-language oratorio by Simon Mayr to a libretto by Felice Romani, premiered in Naples, 1822.

Recordings
 Atalía - Atalia: Rebecca Martin, Abner: Jacek Janiszewski, Gioas: Maria Jette, Giocada: Thomas Cooley, Matan: James Taylor; Simon Mayr Chor Ingolstadt, Neue Düsseldorfer Hofmusik, Franz Hauk  (live 20  September 2003) Guild

References

Oratorios by Simon Mayr
Libretti by Felice Romani